Abdou Atchabao (born 18 June 1990) is a Togolese-born, Gabonese football striker for Ittihad Tanger.

References

1993 births
Living people
Togolese emigrants to Gabon
Gabonese footballers
Gabon international footballers
CF Mounana players
Association football forwards
Gabonese expatriate footballers
Expatriate footballers in Morocco
Gabonese expatriate sportspeople in Morocco
21st-century Gabonese people
Renaissance Club Athletic Zemamra players
Ittihad Tanger players
2016 African Nations Championship players
Gabon A' international footballers